The Spain men's national under-21 field hockey team represent Spain in men's international under-21 field hockey competitions and is controlled by the Royal Spanish Hockey Federation, the governing body for field hockey in Spain.

The team competes in the EuroHockey Junior Championships and has qualified for all editions of the Junior World Cups except the 1985 edition. Their biggest successes where the bronze medal at the 2005 Junior World Cup and their three titles at the EuroHockey Junior Championships.

Tournament record

Junior World Cup
 1979 – 9th place
 1982 – 7th place
 1989 – 8th place
 1993 – 7th place
 1997 – 8th place
 2001 – 5th place
 2005 – 
 2009 – 8th place
 2013 – 13th place
 2016 – 6th place
 2021 – 7th place
 2023 – Qualified

EuroHockey Junior Championship
 1976 – 
 1977 – 
 1978 – 5th place
 1981 – 4th place
 1988 – 4th place
 1992 – 
 1996 – 4th place
 1998 – 4th place
 2000 – 
 2002 – 
 2004 – 
 2006 – 4th place
 2008 – 
 2010 – 6th place
 2012 – 6th place
 2014 – 5th place
 2017 – 4th place
 2019 – 4th place
 2022 – 4th place

Source:

Current squad
The following 18 players were named on 19 July 2022 for the 2022 Men's EuroHockey Junior Championship in Ghent, Belgium from 24 to 30 July 2022.

Caps updated as of 30 July 2022, after the match against Belgium.

Recent call-ups
The following players have also been called up to the squad within the last twelve months.

See also
 Spain men's national field hockey team
 Spain women's national under-21 field hockey team

References

Under-21
Men's national under-21 field hockey teams
Field hockey